Ekin is an unincorporated community in Hamilton and Tipton counties, in the U.S. state of Indiana.

History

Ekin was named for General Ekin by James McKee. McKee built the first frame house in Ekin, which was used as a store. McKee sold his property and moved away after five years. Ekin heard about the naming of the town and send McKee a bible as a gift. Historically, Ekin had a strong timber industry. Ekin timber was exported internationally. A post office was established at Ekin in 1875, and remained in operation until it was discontinued in 1902.

Geography

Ekin is located in the southern part of Jefferson Township, on the county line of Tipton and Hamilton counties.

References

Unincorporated communities in Hamilton County, Indiana
Unincorporated communities in Tipton County, Indiana
Unincorporated communities in Indiana